Sagarejo is a town in Kakheti, Georgia. It serves as an administrative center of Sagarejo district.

The town is traditionally considered a chief settlement of the Gare-Kakheti area (Outer Kakheti). The settlement is first mentioned in written records in the 11th century under the name of Tvali, literally meaning "an eye". Later, it came to be known as Sagarejo, i.e., "of Gareja", indicating that the area was owned by the David Gareja monastery. It acquired town status in 1962.

The fortified ruins of the ancient Ninotsminda Cathedral are located near Sagarejo.

See also
Sagarejo shooting

References

External links 
 Sagarejo Municipality website.

Cities and towns in Kakheti
Tiflis Governorate